Herman's Hermits are an English pop group formed in 1964 in Manchester and fronted by singer Peter Noone. Known for their jaunty beat sound and Noone's tongue-in-cheek vocal style, the Hermits charted numerous transatlantic hits in the UK and in America, where they ranked as one of the most successful acts in the Beatles-led British Invasion. At the pinnacle of their popularity in 1965, the group logged twenty-four consecutive weeks in the top 10 of the US Billboard chart, and reached number one with the singles "Mrs. Brown, You've Got a Lovely Daughter" and "I'm Henry VIII, I Am". Their other international hits include "I'm Into Something Good" (their sole UK number-one), "Can't You Hear My Heartbeat", "Silhouettes", "Wonderful World", "A Must to Avoid", "There's a Kind of Hush", "I Can Take or Leave Your Loving", "Something's Happening" and "My Sentimental Friend", all of which were produced by Mickie Most. They also appeared in four films, two of which were vehicles for the band.

Recordings
Their chart debut was a cover of Gerry Goffin and Carole King's "I'm into Something Good" (a then recent US Top 40 hit for Earl-Jean). In September 1964 it replaced the Kinks' "You Really Got Me" at number one in the UK singles chart and in December reached no. 13 in the US. The Hermits never topped the British charts again, but in America in 1965—when Billboard magazine ranked them America's top singles act of the year (with the Beatles at no. 2)—they topped the Hot 100 with two non-UK releases: "Mrs. Brown You've Got a Lovely Daughter" and "I’m Henry VIII, I Am” (a cover of the 1910 Cockney-style music hall song  "I'm Henery the Eighth, I Am"). The no. 12 debut of "Mrs. Brown" on the Hot 100 in April 1965 was the decade's third highest (behind the Beatles' "Hey Jude" and "Get Back").

Between late 1964 and early 1968 Herman's Hermits never failed to reach the Top 40 in the States. Six of their 11 US Top Tens were not released as A-side singles in their native UK, including the two afore-mentioned number ones plus "Can't You Hear My Heartbeat" (no. 2), "Listen People"  (no. 3), a cover of Noel Gay's 1937 song "Leaning on a Lamp-post" (no. 9, under the title "Leaning on the Lamp Post") and their version of Ray Davies's "Dandy" (no. 5). Conversely they hit big in Britain between 1968 and 1970 with several major hits which failed to register in America, among them the four Top Tens "Sunshine Girl" (no. 8), "Something's Happening" (no. 6), "My Sentimental Friend" (no. 2) and "Years May Come, Years May Go" (no. 7). Their final UK hit, "Lady Barbara" (no. 13), released in the autumn of 1970, was credited to 'Peter Noone & Herman's Hermits'.

Films
The band's US records were released by MGM Records, which often showcased its musical performers in MGM films. On screen the Hermits featured opposite Connie Francis in When the Boys Meet the Girls (1965) and starred outright in Hold On! (1966) — featuring one song performed by co-star Shelley Fabares and nine by the Hermits including the title track — and Mrs. Brown, You've Got a Lovely Daughter (1968). They also appeared in the 1965 British music revue film Pop Gear. Peter Noone left the band in 1971, but Herman's Hermits reunited in 1973 to headline a British invasion tour of the US which culminated in a performance at Madison Square Garden and an appearance on The Midnight Special. A later lineup, which returned only lead guitarist Derek Leckenby and drummer Barry Whitwam, opened for the Monkees on their 1980s reunion tours of the US. The band continues to tour today, with Whitwam as the only remaining member from the original lineup.

Personnel

1963–1971 
Herman's Hermits was formed from two different local bands. Keith Hopwood (rhythm guitar, backing vocals), Karl Green (lead guitar, backing vocals), Alan Wrigley (bass), Steve Titterington (drums) and Peter Noone (lead vocals) came from the Heartbeats where Hopwood had replaced rhythm guitarist Alan Chadwick. The second-youngest member of a young group (four months older than Karl Green who was originally in the Balmains), 15-year-old Noone was already an experienced actor on the popular British TV soap opera Coronation Street. Derek "Lek" Leckenby (lead guitar) and Barry Whitwam (drums) (born Jan Barry Whitwam) joined later from another local group, the Wailers. Whitwam replaced Titterington on drums, Green switched to bass guitar (replacing Wrigley) and Leckenby took over for Green as lead guitarist. After Leckenby joined the band, the group made a deal with producer Mickie Most and signed with EMI's Columbia label in Europe and MGM Records in the United States.

The band's name came from a resemblance, noted by a publican in Manchester, England, between Noone and Sherman from the Rocky and Bullwinkle cartoons. Sherman was shortened to Herman and then became Herman and His Hermits, which was soon shortened to Herman's Hermits.

Harvey Lisberg discovered them and signed on as their manager. He sent a plane ticket to London record producer Mickie Most so that he could fly to see the band play in Bolton. Most, already a success with the Animals, became the group's producer and controlled the band's output. He emphasised a simple and non-threatening clean-cut image.

The band played on most of its singles, including "I'm into Something Good", "Can't You Hear My Heartbeat", "Mrs. Brown You've Got a Lovely Daughter", "I'm Henry VIII, I Am" (said at the time to be "the fastest-selling song in history"), "A Must to Avoid", "Listen People", "You Won't Be Leaving" and "Leaning on a Lamp Post".  Leckenby soloed on "Henry" and Hopwood played rhythm guitar on "Mrs. Brown".  Despite the group's competent musicianship, some subsequent singles employed session musicians – including Big Jim Sullivan, Jimmy Page, John Paul Jones, Vic Flick and Bobby Graham – with contributions from the band, although the role of session players on Herman's Hermits records has been exaggerated in the rock media and in liner notes on the 2004 ABKCO Records compilation Retrospective (which does not credit the Hermits' playing). Mickie Most used session musicians on many records he produced; this was industry practice at the time. Even respected groups such as the Yardbirds were required by Most to use session musicians (except Jimmy Page) on their Most-produced recordings.

Continuing acrimony among former members of Herman's Hermits has increased the amount of disinformation about the group's role on their records; the late Derek Leckenby, in particular, was a skilled guitarist. Mickie Most commented on the VH1 My Generation: Herman's Hermits episode that the Hermits "played on a lot of their records, and some they didn't." The group played on all their UK and US no. 1 hits ("I'm into Something Good", "Mrs. Brown You've Got a Lovely Daughter" and "I'm Henry VIII, I Am"), on most of their US Top Ten singles, on a number of other singles and on most album cuts. According to Peter Noone, Leckenby played the muted lead on "This Door Swings Both Ways". The riff in "Silhouettes" variously has been credited to Jimmy Page, Big Jim Sullivan and Vic Flick; however, according to Keith Hopwood and Karl Green, Leckenby replaced Flick in the studio and played the signature riff under Most's direction. According to Hopwood, Green and Noone, Jimmy Page played on the single "Wonderful World" (although Big Jim Sullivan lists the song as part of a session he played); both may have added to the backing track. Several writers have claimed that session players played on "I'm into Something Good"; according to the surviving band members, the song was recorded on a two-track recorder, with only a piano player in addition to the Hermits.

Karl Green has noted that he preferred harder rock, but was grateful for the hand he was dealt. Many of the band's singles and album tracks were written by some of the top songwriters of the day, but Noone, Leckenby, Hopwood and Green contributed lesser-known songs such as "My Reservation's Been Confirmed", "Take Love, Give Love", "Marcel's", "For Love", "Tell Me Baby", "Busy Line", Moonshine Man", "I Know Why" and "Gaslight Street". "I Know Why" enjoyed a limited A-side release.

The band's debut hit "I'm into Something Good" was written by iconic New York songwriting duo Gerry Goffin (lyrics) and Carole King (music). Ray Davies of the Kinks wrote "Dandy"  – a 1966 US no. 5 hit for the Hermits – and  Graham Gouldman wrote three of their 1966 hits: "Listen People", "No Milk Today" and "East West", the latter of which was covered in 1989 by singer and Hermits fan Morrissey. P. F. Sloan ("Eve of Destruction") wrote the title track of the Hermits' soundtrack to the 1966 film Hold On!. Sloan and regular collaborator Steve Barri—whose songs include "Let Me Be", "You Baby" and "Secret Agent Man"—also co-wrote "Where Were You When I Needed You", "All the Things I Do for You Baby" and the Top Ten hit "A Must to Avoid", all recorded by Herman's Hermits.

In November 1966 in the UK, after two consecutive Top 20 hits, the Hermits returned to the Top Ten with "No Milk Today", backed with "My Reservation's Been Confirmed". For the US release of "No Milk Today" in 1967, MGM backed it with "There's a Kind of Hush". The latter climbed to no. 4 in March 1967. "No Milk Today" peaked at no. 35, though it was linked to "Hush" on local charts across the country. "No Milk Today" also scored in its own right including success on San Francisco Top 40 station KFRC, where in April 1967 it reached no. 1, ranking 6 for the year.

In 1966 the group was nominated for three Grammy awards including Best New Artist of 1965—they lost to singer Tom Jones—and two for their chart-topper "Mrs. Brown You've Got a Lovely Daughter": Best Performance by a Vocal Group and Best Contemporary (R&R) Performance – Group (Vocal or Instrumental). According to Noone and Hopwood, "Mrs. Brown" was recorded as an afterthought in two takes – using two microphones, with Hopwood on guitar, Green on bass guitar and Whitwam on drums. Noone and the band deliberately emphasised their English accents on the record, never intended to be a single. Hopwood recalls playing a Gretsch Country Gentleman guitar in the studio, with its strings muted to create the distinctive sound. When playing the song live, Hopwood often used a Rickenbacker guitar with a rag tied around the bridge to duplicate the sound, which can be seen clearly in old performance clips.

In America the group appeared on The Ed Sullivan Show, The Dean Martin Show and The Jackie Gleason Show.

The 1967 album Blaze received critical acclaim, but barely made the Top 100 in the US and was not released in the UK. Highlights, according to some, included original songs by Leckenby, Whitwam, Hopwood, Green and Noone, including "Ace King Queen Jack" and the psychedelic "Moonshine Man".

A 1969 two-disc album Herman's Hermits Rock 'n' Roll Party was never released.

1971–present 
When Noone left the group in 1971, the Hermits continued, first with singer Pete Cowap. They signed with RCA Records in the UK and, as "The Hermits", recorded two singles at Strawberry Studios and an unreleased album (under the name Sourmash) produced by Eric Stewart. The group subsequently cut one-off singles for Private Stock, Buddah and Roulette in respectively 1975, 1976 and 1977, without significant success. Noone did return to front Herman's Hermits during a 1973–1974 U.S. multi-artist tour of "British Invasion" acts, after which Whitwam, Leckenby and Green (who assumed lead vocal duties until his 1980 retirement) continued to tour with newer members, including Rod Gerrard (formerly with Wayne Fontana & the Mindbenders and Salford Jets).

Hopwood and Leckenby eventually started a music company, Pluto Music, which is still in business as of 2023 working primarily on commercial and animation soundtracks. Hopwood has since become a composer of scores for film and television. Green has become a manager of sound systems for concert venues along London's South Bank.

Leckenby died of non-Hodgkin lymphoma in 1994, leaving Whitwam as the only original member of the band. The band's current lineup consists of Whitwam, lead singer and bassist Geoff Foot, guitarist Paul Cornwell and keyboardist Tony Hancox. Noone continues to play solo shows billed as "Herman's Hermits starring Peter Noone". Legal disputes between Whitwam and Noone have forced the former to rename the band "Herman's Hermits starring Barry Whitwam" when they tour in North America, but they remain billed as "Herman's Hermits" worldwide.

The Sourmash album from 1972 was finally released in 2000 under the title A Whale of a Tale! And Others.

Discography 

Studio albums
 Herman's Hermits (1965, US/UK)
 Herman's Hermits on Tour (1965, US)
 Hold On! (1966, US)
 Both Sides of Herman's Hermits (1966, US/UK)
 There's a Kind of Hush All over the World (1967, US/UK)
 Blaze (1967, US)
 Mrs. Brown, You've Got a Lovely Daughter (1968, US/UK)

Filmography 
1965 – When the Boys Meet the Girls
1966 – Hold On!
1968 – Mrs. Brown, You've Got a Lovely Daughter

Band members 
Original members are listed in bold.

Current members
 Barry Whitwam – drums (1964–present)
 Geoff Foot – lead and backing vocals (1980–present), guitar (2020–present), bass guitar (1980–2020)
 Tony Hancox – keyboards, lead and backing vocals (2017–present)
 Jamie Thurston – lead and backing vocals, bass guitar (2020–present)
Former members
 Peter Noone – lead vocals (1964–1971, 1973)
 Derek Leckenby – lead guitar (1964–1994; died 1994)
 Keith Hopwood – rhythm guitar, backing vocals (1964–1972)
 Karl Green – bass, backing vocals (1964–1980); lead vocals (1972–1980)
 Pete Cowap – lead vocals, rhythm guitar (1971–1972; died 1997)
 John Gaughan – rhythm guitar, backing vocals (1972–1975)
 Frank Renshaw – rhythm guitar, backing vocals (1975–1982)
 Rod Gerrard – rhythm guitar,  backing vocals (1986–1995)
 Eddy Carter – lead guitar, backing vocals (1994–2013)
 Kevan Lingard – keyboards, backing vocals (2006–2016)
 Paul Robinson – keyboards, backing vocals (2016–2016)
 Paul Cornwell – lead guitar, backing vocals (2013–2019)
 Justin LaBarge – rhythm guitar, backing vocals (2015–2019)

 Ray Frost – lead guitar, backing vocals (2019–2020)

Timeline

References

External links 

 Official Herman's Hermits site – Peter Noone version
 Official Herman's Hermits site – Barry Whitwam version
 Pluto Music – Keith Hopwood's studio
 Peter Noone official website
 Karl Green's official website
 
 
 Herman's Hermits at Harvey Lisberg

Musical groups established in 1963
English pop music groups
Beat groups
British Invasion artists
Musical groups from Manchester
1963 establishments in England
Columbia Graphophone Company artists
MGM Records artists